Košarkaški klub Joker, commonly referred to as KK Joker, is a men's basketball club based in Sombor, Vojvodina, Serbia. They are currently competing in the 2nd-tier Second Basketball League of Serbia. The club bears the name after Serbian NBA All Star player Nikola Jokić who is nicknamed the Joker.

History 
Founded in 2002 as KK SO Koš in Sombor, the club changed its name to KK Joker after the nickname of Serbian NBA All Star player Nikola Jokić who started his playing career with the club. In 2018, the club held the inaugural Joker Basketball Camp in Sombor.

In the 2019–20 Cup of Serbia quarterfinals, the club loss to Sloboda Užice.

In November 2021, the team qualified for the 2021–22 Cup of Serbia, following a 81–80 win over Spartak Subotica.

Players 

 Zoran Krstanović

Head coaches 

  Isidor Rudić (2019–2021)
  Nebojša Vagić (2021–present)

Trophies and awards

Trophies
 First Regional League, North Division (3rd-tier)
 Winners (1): 2021–22

References

External links
 Profile at srbijasport.net 
 SO Koš Profile at srbijasport.net
 Profile at eurobasket.com

Joker
Joker
Joker
Sombor